Sir William Henry Dyke Acland, 3rd Baronet  (18 May 1888 – 4 December 1970) was the eldest son of Sir William Acland, 2nd Baronet and Hon. Emily Anna Smith.

Succession
He succeeded his father as 3rd Baronet Acland, of St. Mary Magdalen, Oxford on the latter's death on 26 November 1924. On his death in 1970 he was succeeded in the baronetcy by his younger brother.

Education
He attended Eton College and Christ Church, Oxford.

Career
He fought in the Great War, where he was wounded, and Mentioned in Dispatches. He served with the Royal Artillery and the Royal Flying Corps. He was awarded with the Military Cross, the Air Force Cross and the Territorial Decoration. At various times he acted as Deputy Lieutenant, Justice of the Peace, High Sheriff (1851) and County Alderman for Hertfordshire.

Family
He married Margaret Emily Barclay (d.1967), daughter of Charles Theodore Barclay, on 26 April 1916, and had issue:
Elizabeth Margaret Acland (1919–1998), married Major Edward Cecil O'Brien (1943)
Juliet Mary Acland (1922–1991), married Peter Robert Tabor (1939)
Sarah Josephine Acland (1930–1961), married George Edward Brown (1954)
Rosalyn Emily Patricia Acland (21 November 1931 – 2006), married Kenneth John Coles (1953)

References

Sources
'ACLAND, Sir William Henry Dyke', Who Was Who, A & C Black, 1920–2007; online edn, Oxford University Press, Dec 2007

1888 births
1970 deaths
People educated at Eton College
Alumni of Christ Church, Oxford
William Henry Dyke
Baronets in the Baronetage of the United Kingdom
Royal Artillery officers
Deputy Lieutenants of Hertfordshire
English justices of the peace
High Sheriffs of Hertfordshire
Recipients of the Air Force Cross (United Kingdom)
Recipients of the Military Cross
Royal Flying Corps officers
Royal Air Force officers
British Army personnel of World War I
Royal Air Force personnel of World War I